The 2022–23 Cymru North season (also known as the 2022–23 JD Cymru North season for sponsorship reasons) is the fourth season of the second-tier Northern region football in the Welsh football pyramid. Teams play each other twice on a home and away basis.

Teams
The league consisted of 16 clubs.

Team changes

To Cymru North
Promoted from Ardal NE
 Chirk AAA

Promoted from Ardal NW
 Mold Alexandra
 Porthmadog

Relegated from Cymru Premier
 Cefn Druids

From Cymru North
Promoted to Cymru Premier
 Airbus UK Broughton

Relegated to Ardal NE
 Llanrhaeadr

Relegated to Ardal NW
 Llangefni Town

Withdrew from league
 Bangor City

Stadia and locations

Personnel and kits

Managerial changes

League table

Results

References 

2022–23 in Welsh football
Cymru North seasons
Wales
Current association football seasons